The Kliegle Garage in Goodwin, South Dakota, United States, was built in 1916.  It was listed on the National Register of Historic Places in 1999.

It is a one-story building constructed with cast stone walls,  in plan.

References

Commercial buildings on the National Register of Historic Places in South Dakota
Commercial buildings completed in 1916
Deuel County, South Dakota